Claire Elise Katz (born 4 November 1964) is an American philosopher and professor of philosophy at Texas A&M University. She is known for her expertise on feminist theory, modern Jewish thought, philosophy of education, and philosophy of religion.
Katz was appointed the Murray and Celeste Fasken Chair in Distinguished Teaching in 2017 and awarded the American Philosophical Association's Prize for Excellence in Philosophy Teaching in 2019.

Philosophy for Children Texas 
Katz is director of Texas A&M's Philosophy for Children program, which has aimed to incorporate philosophy into primary and secondary education since its inception in 2016.

Awards and prizes
 Prize for Excellence in Philosophy Teaching, American Philosophical Association, 2019
 Murray and Celeste Fasken Chair in Distinguished Teaching, Texas A&M University, 2017-2022

Books
 Unrepentant Women: Gender, Judaism, and the Limits of Forgiveness, Indiana University Press, forthcoming
 Growing Up with Philosophy Camp: How Learning to Think Develops Friendship, Community, and a Sense of Self, Rowman & Littlefield Publishers, 2020
 An Introduction to Modern Jewish Philosophy, I.B. Tauris Press, 2014
 Levinas and the Crisis of Humanism, Indiana University Press, 2013
 Levinas, Judaism, and the Feminine: The Silent Footsteps of Rebecca, Bloomington: Indiana University Press, 2003

References

External links
 Claire Katz at Texas A&M
 Works by Claire Katz
 Why the Humanities Are Important | Claire Katz | TEDxTAMU
 Philosophy for Children Texas

21st-century American philosophers
Continental philosophers
Philosophers of religion
Levinas scholars
Philosophy academics
University System of Maryland alumni
Montclair State University alumni
Texas A&M University faculty
University of Memphis alumni
1964 births
Living people
French–English translators